Ariel is an unincorporated community in Cowlitz County, Washington. The Ariel community is part of the Woodland School District, a K-12 school district of about 2,200 students.

Geography
Ariel is located at  (45.9567789, -122.5709345).

Culture

D. B. Cooper Days
Every year since 2011 the D. B. Cooper Days are held at the Ariel Store and Tavern. The festival is a celebration of the skyjacking case of Dan Cooper, who hijacked a Boeing 727 over the Cascade Mountains with US$200,000 on November 24, 1971.

External links
Woodland Public Schools website
Ariel, Washington Tourism - Washington Travel & Recreation

References

Unincorporated communities in Cowlitz County, Washington
Unincorporated communities in Washington (state)